Jesus Chediak (10 August 1941 – 8 May 2020) was a Brazilian actor, film director, film producer, journalist, and theatre director.

Life
During his cinematic career, Chediak was responsible for six feature films, working at various functions such as, actor, director, producer and writer.

Aside from his career in cinema, he also worked as a professor at Federal University of Bahia.

In 2017, he was appointed Casa França-Brasil's new director.

At the time of his death, Chediak held the post of Cultural manager of the Associação Brasileira de Imprensa.

Personal life
Chediak was married to journalist Glória Chediak. The couple had four kids.

He had two brothers, Braz Chediak who is also an actor, screenwriter and filmmaker and Almir Chediak who was a record producer.

Death
On 8 May 2020, Chediak died from COVID-19 during the COVID-19 pandemic in Brazil in Rio de Janeiro at the age 78.

Filmography

Film

References

External links
 

1941 births
2020 deaths
Brazilian film actors
Brazilian stage actors
Brazilian film directors
Brazilian film producers
Brazilian theatre directors
Deaths from the COVID-19 pandemic in Rio de Janeiro (state)

Brazilian people of Lebanese descent